The Paris Theatre was a cinema and theatre located on the corner of Wentworth Avenue and Liverpool Street in Sydney that showed films and vaudeville, cabaret and plays. The theatre changed names several times, trading as Australia Picture Palace (1915-1935), Tatler Theatre (1935-1950), Park Theatre (1952-1954) and Paris Theatre (1954-1981) before being demolished in 1981. In May 1978 the theatre hosted a film festival that inspired the first Sydney Gay Mardi Gras. The theatre was also the home of Paris Theatre Company, a Sydney based theatre company.

Building

Located at 205-207 Liverpool Street, Sydney on the corner of Wentworth Avenue, the architect was Walter Burley Griffin The theatre was a reinforced concrete building with relief stucco paneling. It was demolished in 1981.

History

Australian Picture Palace (1915-1935) 
The Australia Picture Palace designed by Walter Burley Griffin was built in 1915 for Hoyt’s Theatres Ltd and opened on 7 January 1916.

Tatler Theatre (1935-1950) 
In 1935, the theatre was renovated and renamed the Tatler Theatre. On 5 August 1943 Austral American Productions began showing first-run Warner Brothers films in an exclusive arrangement.

Some performances at the theatre include the film “They Died with their Boots On” featuring Errol Flynn on 5 August 1943.

Park Theatre (1952-1954) 
In 1952 Hoyts purchased the theatre and it was renamed the Park Theatre.

Paris Theatre (1954-1981) 
The theatre was renovated in 1954 and renamed the Paris Theatre.

From 21–27 May 1978, 900 people attended Sydney's first gay film festival at the Paris Theatre. One of the films, Word is Out, inspired Ron Austin, a member of CAMP, with the idea of a street party which later became the first Mardi Gras in June of that year.

Some notable performances at the theatre included

 20 November 1977 Rose Tattoo
27 November 1977 Cold Chisel
August 1978  Louis Nowra play, Visions, opened.
28 November 1979 Boys Own MacBeth
20 December 1980 INXS

Paris Theatre Company 
The Paris Company (formally the Paris Theatre Performance Group Limited) formed in March 1978 by Jim Sharman and Rex Cramphorn staged two new Australian plays at the theatre: Dorothy Hewett's musical play Pandora's Cross which opened in June 1978 and Louis Nowra's Visions which opened in August 1978.

References

Former theatres in Sydney
Former music venues in Australia
Demolished buildings and structures in Sydney
Buildings and structures demolished in 1981
Cinemas in Sydney
Former cinemas